Ancistrus tolima is a species of catfish in the family Loricariidae. It is native to South America, where it occurs in the Magdalena River drainage, which is part of the Prado River basin in Colombia. The species reaches 7.7 cm (3 inches) SL. Its specific epithet is a reference to Colombia's Tolima Department, which contains the type locality of the species.

References 

tolima
Fish described in 2013